Rice Creek might refer to:

Rice Creek (British Columbia), a stream in British Columbia, Canada
Rice Creek (Feather River), a North Fork Feather River tributary in California
Rice Creek (St. Johns River), a stream in Florida
Rice Creek, Michigan, a community
Rice Creek (Elk River), a stream in Minnesota
Rice Creek (Mississippi River), a stream in the Minneapolis-St. Paul metropolitan area
Rice Creek (Snake River), a stream in Minnesota
Rice Creek (Missouri)